Saint Ingemo Fountain   was a sacrificial source and fountain of devotion in the Swedish province of Västergötland, located between Skövde and Tidaholm.

The cult of Saint Ingemo is certified only since the time of the Protestant Reformation. Her canonization has never taken place and that the Church has never ranked her among the official saints. Nothing is known of her life.

This is a speculation that her name was Ingamoder  which means "mother of Inge" (King Inge of Sweden).

Bibliography
Wilhelmina Stålberg, Notepad on swedish women,  S: ta Ingemo 1864.
Carl Henrik Martling, A chronicle about swedish saints In  2001  
National Heritage, Dala object 113: 1

Fountains in Sweden
Västergötland